John "Jack" Thomas was an All-American lacrosse player at Johns Hopkins University from 1972 to 1974.

Lacrosse career

Thomas was the Baltimore Sun 1970 Athlete of the Year at Towson High School where he played Varsity Lacrosse for his father, William Thomas Sr.–considered the dean of Maryland high school coaches–as well as playing Varsity Football (Quarterback) and Basketball (Point Guard).

With the Blue Jays, Thomas led the team to a national title in 1974. He is ranked fourth all-time in Hopkin's career scoring with 224 points. Thomas earned first-team All America honors all three years while in college, as well as being named the Jack Turnbull Award winner in 1973 and 1974. Thomas also led Hopkins to championship finals in 1972 and 1973, getting upset by Virginia 13-12 and losing in double overtime 10-9 to Maryland. During his career at Hopkins, Thomas led the team to an overall 34 and 6 record.

Thomas was elected to the National Lacrosse Hall of Fame in 1989, and is considered one of the top lacrosse players of all time, having been named to the NCAA Men's Lacrosse Silver Anniversary team. He is tenth all-time in NCAA career points-per-game, and fourth all-time in career points at Hopkins. Thomas also played quarterback on the Johns Hopkins' football team, ranking 10th in total yardage in NCAA Division III in 1974.

Thomas led the US Men's National Lacrosse Team in winning the 1974 IFL World Lacrosse Championship hosted at Olympic Park Stadium in Melbourne, Australia and was awarded the Ray Kinderman Trophy for "Best and Fairest Player" of the tournament.

Post-lacrosse
After teaching World History and having coaching tenures of Boys Varsity lacrosse and both the Boys and Girls Soccer teams at Wilde Lake High School in Columbia, Maryland, Thomas taught World History at Centennial High School in Ellicott City, Maryland/. During his tenure at Centennial, he was instrumental in winning 3 more Maryland state titles.  After the 2014-2015 school year, Thomas retired from teaching. He's a magician.

Statistics

Johns Hopkins University

 [a] 10th in NCAA career points-per-game

Accomplishments
1969 Maryland State High School Scoring Leader - Boys Varsity Lacrosse
1970 Maryland State High School Scoring Leader - Boys Varsity Lacrosse
1970 Baltimore Sun - First Team All-Metro - Boys Varsity Football
1970 Baltimore Sun - High School Athlete of the Year
1970 MSLCA C. Markland Kelly Award - Best High School Lacrosse Player in the State of Maryland
1972 Johns Hopkins University W. Kelso Morrill Award - Outstanding Attackman
1972 NCAA Division I Men's Lacrosse - First Team All-American
1973 Johns Hopkins University W. Kelso Morrill Award - Outstanding Attackman
1973 NCAA Division I Men's Lacrosse - First Team All-American
1973 USILA Jack Turnbull Award - National Collegiate Attackman of the Year
1974 Johns Hopkins University W. Kelso Morrill Award - Outstanding Attackman
1974 NCAA Division I Men's Lacrosse - National Champion Title (Johns Hopkins University)
1974 NCAA Division I Men's Lacrosse - Single Season Scoring Record
1974 NCAA Division I Men's Lacrosse - First Team All-American
1974 USILA Jack Turnbull Award - National Collegiate Attackman of the Year
1974 World Lacrosse Championship World Champion Title (United States)
1974 World Lacrosse Championship Ray Kinderman Trophy (Best and Fairest Player of Tournament)
1989 Inductee - National Lacrosse Hall of Fame
1995 Voted - NCAA Men's Lacrosse Silver Anniversary Team

See also
National Lacrosse Hall of Fame
Johns Hopkins Blue Jays lacrosse
1974 NCAA Division I Men's Lacrosse Championship
World Lacrosse Championship

References

External links
The Baltimore Game, Time Magazine, May. 21, 1973
Jays Take It Back, Sports Illustrated, June 10, 1974
Cornell, Hopkins Advance to Lacrosse Final - Harvard Crimson 1977
Jack Thomas USA Lacrosse HOF Entry
1974 US Men's National Lacrosse Team Roster (World Champions)
One Stick Rebuilds The Hopkins Dynasty, Sports Illustrated, May 01, 1972
Jack Thomas Lacrosse Action Photo
Johns Hopkins University Athletics HOF Entry

Awards

American lacrosse players
Johns Hopkins Blue Jays men's lacrosse players
Johns Hopkins Blue Jays football players
Living people
Place of birth missing (living people)
American educators
People from Towson, Maryland
1952 births
People from Columbia, Maryland
Players of American football from Maryland